The name Hazel has been used for two tropical cyclones in the Atlantic Ocean, three in the eastern Pacific Ocean, one in the western Pacific, and one in the Indian Ocean. It was used in all basins before formal naming systems were instituted. It has not been used since the six-year lists began; the name will never again be used in the Atlantic or East Pacific as it was retired in both basins.

North Atlantic:
 Hurricane Hazel (1953)
 Hurricane Hazel (1954) – killed over 1000 people in Haiti, caused damage and death from South Carolina to Ontario

Northeast Pacific:
 Tropical Depression Hazel (1963) – was downgraded after the fact; it never warranted a name.
 Tropical Storm Hazel (1965)

Northwest Pacific:
 Typhoon Hazel (1948) (T4819)

Southwest Indian Ocean:
 Cyclone Hazel (1965) – southwest Indian Ocean

Southwest Pacific Ocean:
 Cyclone Hazel (1979)

Atlantic hurricane set index articles
Pacific hurricane set index articles
Pacific typhoon set index articles
South-West Indian Ocean cyclone set index articles
Australian region cyclone set index articles